Mrs. Eastwood & Company is an American reality documentary television series that premiered May 20, 2012, on E!. The show chronicles the lives of Dina Eastwood, then-wife of actor/director Clint Eastwood, and their daughters, Francesca and Morgan. Dina Eastwood manages the six-person a cappella group Overtone, who also live with the Eastwoods in their Carmel-by-the-Sea, California mansion.

Cast

Main cast
 Dina Ruiz Eastwood: Dina is a former television news reporter and television personality who has been married to Clint Eastwood since 1996.
 Francesca Eastwood: Francesca is Dina's 20-year-old stepdaughter. She is Clint's daughter from his previous relationship with Frances Fisher. She lives in Los Angeles with her boyfriend. 
 Morgan Eastwood: Morgan is Dina and Clint's 16-year-old daughter.
 Overtone: an a cappella band from Johannesburg, South Africa. Dina discovered them during the production of her husband's film Invictus. Dina manages them and relocated the band to California in order to help them sign a recording contract.

Supporting cast
 Tyler Shields: Francesca's boyfriend who is a photographer.
 Lisa Thrash: the Eastwoods' housekeeper.
 Dominic "Dom" Ruiz: Dina's brother and Overtone's road manager.
 Jade Marx-Berti: Dominic's wife. She is an actress and is the granddaughter of Groucho Marx.
 Clint Eastwood: Dina's husband and father of Francesca and Morgan. He is a famed actor, director and former mayor of Carmel.

Episodes

References

External links

2010s American reality television series
2012 American television series debuts
2012 American television series endings
English-language television shows
E! original programming
Eastwood family
Television series by Bunim/Murray Productions
Television shows set in California